Sunny Garcia Surfing is an extreme sports video game endorsed by surfer Sunny Garcia, developed by Krome Studios, published by Ubi Soft, and released for PlayStation 2 in 2001.

Reception 

The game received "mixed" reviews according to the review aggregation website Metacritic.

References

External links 
 

2001 video games
Black people in art
Garcia
Garcia
Krome Studios games
Multiplayer and single-player video games
PlayStation 2 games
PlayStation 2-only games
Surfing video games
Ubisoft games
Video games developed in Australia
Video games based on real people